Charlie Charlie is a 2021 Nigerian movie produced by Charles Uwagbai and Monica Swaida, directed by Charles Uwagbai.  The movie render it's voice to the menace of  human trafficking and money laundering in the Society  The film stars Omoni Oboli, Monica Swaida, Mary Remmy Njoku, Alexx Ekubo, Chioma Akpotha, Etinosa Idemudia, and Prince David Osei.

Synopsis 
The movie revolves around two identical individuals; a drug cartel member and an innocent man. The innocent man is mistaken for the drug dealer and was caught in the drug operations running Nigeria through Ghana, Morocco to Europe. The mistaken identity caused the cartel to lose money which bounces back on the two.

Settings 
The movie was shot in Lagos, Ghana, and Europe.

Premiere 
The was privately screened at the PEFTI Film Institute in Lagos state before it was released to the Cinemas on July 16, 2021.

Cast   
Femi Adebayo, Chioma Chukwuka Akpotha, Sani Danja, Alexx Ekubo, Etinosa Idemudia, Abimbola Kazeem, Funky Mallam, Omoni Oboli, Prince David Osei, Mary Remmy, Monica Swaida and Oluwatoyin Albert Tomama.

References 

2021 films
Nigerian crime drama films
English-language Nigerian films